Beverley Road may refer to:

 Beverley Road, a major road that runs out of Hull in the East Riding of Yorkshire, England

New York City Subway
Beverley Road (BMT Brighton Line), serving the 
Beverly Road (IRT Nostrand Avenue Line), misspelled, serving the